Deon D'Marquis Grant (born March 14, 1979) is a former American football safety who played 12 seasons in the National Football League. He played college football for the University of Tennessee, was a member of Tennessee's national championship team and earned All-American honors.  He was drafted by the Carolina Panthers in the second round of the 2000 NFL Draft, and also played professionally for the Jacksonville Jaguars, Seattle Seahawks and New York Giants of the NFL. He won a Super Bowl ring with the Giants against the New England Patriots.

College career
Grant attended the University of Tennessee, and played for the Tennessee Volunteers football team from 1997 to 2000.  He was selected as a consensus first-team All-American in 1999 after he tied for the NCAA lead with nine interceptions for 167 return yards.  He finished the 1999 season with 69 tackles and eight pass breakups. He had two picks in three different games and earned SEC Defensive Player of the week after intercepting three passes versus Auburn.  His leaping interception in UT's overtime win over Florida in 1998 was a crucial play in the Vols' march to the BCS National Championship. Grant left Tennessee and declared for the NFL Draft following his junior year.

Professional career

Carolina Panthers
Grant was drafted in the second round of the 2000 NFL Draft with the 57th overall pick by the Carolina Panthers.

Jacksonville Jaguars
After playing for four seasons with the Panthers, Grant was sent to the Jacksonville Jaguars, where he played for three seasons.

Seattle Seahawks
Grant was picked up in free agency by the Seattle Seahawks in 2007. He was cut March 15, 2010 mostly because of his large contract. He finished his tenure in Seattle with 224 tackles, eight interceptions, and one fumble recovery.

New York Giants
Grant signed with the New York Giants on April 1, 2010. After one season with the Giants, he became an unrestricted free agent, however he re-signed with the Giants on August 16, 2011 to a one-year, $4 million contract. He won a Super Bowl ring in Super Bowl XLVI. Following the season, he became an unrestricted free agent.

On August 7, 2013, Grant retired as a member of the New York Giants.

NFL statistics

Regular season

Postseason

References

1979 births
Living people
All-American college football players
American football safeties
Carolina Panthers players
Jacksonville Jaguars players
New York Giants players
Sportspeople from Renton, Washington
Players of American football from Augusta, Georgia
Seattle Seahawks players
Tennessee Volunteers football players